Ander Bardají Maiza (born 20 April 1995) is a Spanish professional footballer who plays as a goalkeeper.

Club career
Born in Lasarte-Oria, Gipuzkoa, Basque Country, Bardají graduated with Real Sociedad's youth setup. On 1 September 2012, aged only 17, he made his debut as a senior, appearing with the reserves in a 2–1 home win against Real Zaragoza B in the Segunda División B championship.

Bardají was definitely promoted to the B-side on 17 July 2013, after already making seven appearances for it in the previous campaign. On 16 April of the following year he renewed his link with the Txuri-urdin, signing until 2018.

Initially promoted to the main squad for the 2014–15 season after the departure of Claudio Bravo to FC Barcelona, Bardají was only named third-choice due to the arrival of Gerónimo Rulli. After Eñaut Zubikarai's release in June 2015, he was called up to the first team by manager David Moyes for the pre-season, but was only utilized for the B-side after the signing of Oier Olazábal.

Bardají was definitely promoted to the main squad ahead of the 2016–17 campaign, but remained as a backup to Rulli and new signing Toño Ramírez. On 24 July 2017 he cut ties with Real, and signed a three-year deal with Segunda División side SD Huesca just hours later.

Bardají made his professional debut on 6 September 2017, starting in a 0–2 home loss against Real Valladolid, for the season's Copa del Rey. He achieved promotion to La Liga at the end of the campaign, but acting as a third-choice behind Álex Remiro and Roberto Santamaría.

On 14 August 2018, Bardají was loaned to CF Fuenlabrada in the third division for one year, but spent the campaign as a backup to Biel Ribas as his side achieved promotion to the second level. The following 31 July, he moved to fellow third tier side SD Ejea also in a temporary deal.

References

External links

1995 births
Living people
People from Lasarte-Oria
Spanish footballers
Footballers from the Basque Country (autonomous community)
Association football goalkeepers
Segunda División B players
Real Sociedad B footballers
Real Sociedad footballers
SD Huesca footballers
CF Fuenlabrada footballers
SD Ejea players
Spain youth international footballers